Barbara Kaija (born 1964) is a Ugandan journalist and educator, who serves as the editor in chief of the Vision Group of newspapers, including the English daily publication the New Vision.

Background and education
She was educated at Makerere University, Uganda's oldest public university, first graduating with a Bachelor of Arts degree in Education. She followed that with a Master of Arts degree in education, also at Makerere. Later, she obtained a Master of Arts in journalism and media studies, from Rhodes University, in Grahamstown, Eastern Cape, South Africa. She also has a Postgraduate Diploma in Practical Journalism, obtained in Cardiff, Wales in the United Kingdom, under the sponsorship of the Thomson Foundation.

Career
Her tenure at Vision Group spans over 25 years. In 1992, she was hired as a sub-editor trainee. Over time, she was given more responsibilities and rose to the position of Deputy Features Editor. Later she became the Features Editor, serving in that capacity for ten years. She was appointed deputy Editor-in-Chief in 2006 and she became Editor-in-Chief in 2010. In her current capacity, she oversees journalistic standards and strategy of all media platforms (print, radio, television, internet and social media) of the Vision Group. When she assumed the role of Editor-in-Chief in 2010, she became the first Ugandan woman to become a chief editor of a Ugandan major newspaper in the history of the country.

Personal life
Barbara Kaija is married. She is a born-again Christian and her religious beliefs strongly guide her life.

Other considerations
Barbara Kaija has a passion for journalism and commitment to teaching others. She has specialized in "development journalism", in which she has taught and supervised many Ugandan journalist. In 2012, she was awarded the National Jubilee Award, in recognition of her body of work. In March 2011, the Ugandan newspaper Daily Monitor, part of the Aga Khan-owned Nation Media Group, named her one of "Today's Uganda Top Fifty Women Movers".

See also
 Robert Kabushenga
 Patrick Ayota

See also
 List of newspapers in Uganda
 Media in Uganda

References

External links
Website of Vision Group
Website of the New Vision Newspaper
We need independent media regulation – Vision Group Editor-in-Chief As of 6 October 2016.

Living people
Ugandan journalists
People from Western Region, Uganda
Makerere University alumni
Ugandan women journalists
Rhodes University alumni
1976 births